USS Emma has been the name of more than one United States Navy ship, and may refer to:

 , a screw steamer, captured on 24 July 1863 and sold 1 November 1865.
 , a patrol boat in noncommissioned service from 1917 to 1918

United States Navy ship names